is a  tall Ferris wheel in Kasai Rinkai Park, in Edogawa, Tokyo, Japan. It is named for its light shows, which have the appearance of a sparkling diamond or flower.

When completed in 2001, it was the world's second tallest Ferris wheel.  It was also the tallest Ferris wheel ever built in Japan, but was surpassed the following year by the  Sky Dream Fukuoka. However, the Fukuoka wheel closed in September 2009, and the Kasai Rinkai Park wheel once again became Japan's tallest operational Ferris wheel.

Passengers may not smoke and pets are not permitted. Each rotation takes 17 minutes, and on a clear day the views from the top of the wheel include Tokyo, Tokyo Bay, Tokyo Disneyland, Chiba, Mount Fuji, and the Bōsō Peninsula.

References

External links

 Manufacturer's web page for Diamond and Flower Ferris Wheel 

Ferris wheels in Japan
Buildings and structures in Tokyo
Tourist attractions in Tokyo
Edogawa, Tokyo